Indignité nationale (French "national unworthiness") was a legally defined offense, created at the Liberation in the context of the "Épuration légale". The offence of Indignité nationale was meant to fill a legal void: while the laws in application in 1939 had provisions against treason, murder and such crimes, they did not take into account reprehensible behaviours which occurred during the Occupation and in the Vichy regime, such as participation in the Waffen SS or in the Milice. Indignité nationale ceased to be a criminal offense in January 1951 but the people convicted in 1944–1951 remained deprived of their civil rights until August 1953.

History
Gaullist legal preparations to post-war purges started in Lyon in 1942. Chief prosecutor for Paris  joined the Lyon Commission in 1943. Charles de Gaulle was inclined to leave the post-war purges to ad hoc decisions of the judges, relying solely on the 1939 statute that punished treason with death. Meetings of the Consultative Assembly, which convened beginning on January 11, 1944, persuaded de Gaulle that "containing vengeance" would be more difficult than he thought. Indeed, in the few months that followed the Normandy landings, at least 4,500 alleged collaborators were killed in summary judicial executions.

De Gaulle and his government needed a legal instrument which, unlike the 1939 law on treason, would not involve harsh sentences and could thus be applied to a wide circle of offenders. They also wanted to avoid enacting an ex post facto law, and created the concept of continuing "state of indignity" as a workaround solution. The new law instituted a new concept of a criminal state of a person, the state of indignity. A person entered the state of indignity through committing certain acts (not necessarily crimes) in the past, and this state continued until redemption through punishment. The acts leading to "state of indignity" included any voluntary aid to Axis powers after June 16, 1940, or any of numerous specific offences outlined in the law:

 participation in the Vichy Cabinet;
 executive posts in the Vichy propaganda or the Commissariat-General for Jewish Affairs;
 active participation in pro-collaboration demonstrations;
 mere membership in pro-collaboration organizations.

Those found guilty of indignité nationale were subject to a sentence of dégradation nationale and, from September 30, 1944, confiscation of property. The convicted offenders were reduced to a class of second-rate citizens, deprived of election rights, banned from government service, trade unions, mass media, and executive appointments in semi-public companies. The duration of disqualification, from five years to life, was decided by the court on a case-by-case basis. The courts could suspend but not lift the penalty for those who served in the Free French Forces or participated in the Resistance. The courts were not allowed to choose a specific form of disqualification and had to invoke the whole set of bans or acquit the person. The only elective punishments were the confiscation of property and a ban on living in certain areas. The offenders also lost their pension rights, although this was not intended by the legislators and was uncommon in practice.

By the beginning of 1951, when indignité nationale ceased to be a criminal offense, more than 46,000 people had been convicted: 3,158 by the Courts of Justice (counting only the cases where indignité nationale was the main offence) and 46,145 cases tried by the Civic Chambers. Only 3,184 people so charged were acquitted. In 1953, all surviving convictees, except those convicted by the High Court, were amnestied of indignité nationale charges.

See also
Lustration

Notes

References
 Neil J. Kritz, Nelson Mandela (editors, 1995). Transitional Justice: How Emerging Democracies Reckon With Former Regimes. US Institute of Peace Press. .

Legal history of France
Aftermath of World War II in France
Political repression in France
French Fourth Republic
1944 establishments in France
1953 disestablishments in France